"Who Needs Love" is a song by American rapper Trippie Redd from his fourth mixtape A Love Letter to You 4 (2019). It is the third single from the mixtape, released on November 19, 2019. The song was produced by Angel Lopez.

Composition 
On the track, Trippie Redd sings over a looped acoustic guitar instrumental about his aversion towards love, and that he is "living his best life post-breakup". He likely disses his ex-girlfriend, American rapper Coi Leray.

Charts

Certifications

References 

Trippie Redd songs
Songs written by Trippie Redd
2019 songs
2019 singles